In the Line of Duty: The F.B.I. Murders is a 1988 American made-for-television crime film.

Plot

The film is about a real event that occurred on April 11, 1986. Two former army buddies, Mike Platt (played by David Soul) and Bill Matix (Michael Gross), commit a series of murders and bank robberies in Miami, Florida; a group of F.B.I. agents led by Benjamin Grogan (Ronny Cox), is designated to carry out the investigation. The story concludes with one of the bloodiest clashes in FBI history, the 1986 FBI Miami shootout.

Cast 
 Ronny Cox as FBI Special Agent Ben Grogan
 Bruce Greenwood as FBI Special Agent Jerry Dove
 David Soul as Mike Platt
 Michael Gross as Bill Matix
 Doug Sheehan as FBI Special Agent Gordon McNeill
 Randal Patrick as FBI Special Agent Ron Risner 
 Peter McRobbie as FBI Special Agent John Hanlon
 Geoffrey Deuel as FBI Special Agent Gilbert M. Orrantia
 Ronald G. Joseph as FBI Special Agent Edmundo Mireles Jr.
 Richard Jenkins as Detective Hamill
 Lisa Rieffel as Suzanne McNeill
 Deborah May as Elaine McNeill
 Katie Layman as Liz Mireles
 Teri Copley as Vickie
 Anne Lange as Sandra
 Loren Peele as Corey, Sandra's Son
 Becky Ann Baker as Carol Ann
 Jamie Tirelli as Jose Collazo

References 
VideoHound's golden movie retriever 2001 by Jim Craddock

External links

American television films
Federal Bureau of Investigation
1988 television films
1988 films
Crime films based on actual events
Films set in Florida
Films set in 1985
Films set in 1986
Films directed by Dick Lowry
Films scored by Laurence Rosenthal